Thomas Kimball may refer to:

Thomas Lord Kimball, 19th-century Union Pacific Railroad executive and namesake of Kimball County, Nebraska
Thomas Rogers Kimball (1862–1934), his son, Omaha-based architect